İşte Türk Sanat Müziği is Turkish singer Sibel Can's twelfth studio album, which was released on 4 June 2000 in Turkey.

Track listing

References

External links 
 
 

Sibel Can albums
2002 classical albums